Lherm may refer to the following places in France:

 Lherm, Haute-Garonne, a commune in the Haute-Garonne department
 Lherm, Lot, a commune in the Lot department